A list of films produced in Ecuador in year order. 

Ventaja 2019

1920s

1930s

1940s

1950s

1960s

1970s

1980s

1990s

2000s

External links
 Ecuadorian film at the Internet Movie Database

Lists of films by country of production
Films